Statistics of Empress's Cup in the 2012 season.

Overview
It was contested by 32 teams, and INAC Kobe Leonessa won the championship.

Results

1st round
Fukui University of Technology Fukui High School 0-3 Waseda University
Japan Soccer College 3-1 Seiwa Gakuen High School
JFA Academy Fukushima 2-1 Shizuoka Sangyo University
Ehime FC 2-3 Nippon Sport Science University
Nojima Stella Kanagawa 4-1 Melsa Kumamoto FC
Himeji Dokkyo University 0-1 Kamimura Gakuen High School
Kanto Gakuen University 4-2 Sakuyo High School
Niigata University of Health and Welfare 1-3 Fujieda Junshin High School

2nd round
Hokkaido Otani Muroran High School 1-5 Waseda University
Japan Soccer College 0-1 AS Elfen Sayama FC
Osaka University of Health and Sport Sciences 0-3 JFA Academy Fukushima
Nippon Sport Science University 0-6 Vegalta Sendai
Kochi ganador FC 0-10 Nojima Stella Kanagawa
Kamimura Gakuen High School 2-1 Kibi International University
Fukuoka J. Anclas 2-1 Kanto Gakuen University
Fujieda Junshin High School 0-2 Tokiwagi Gakuken High School

3rd round
INAC Kobe Leonessa 1-0 Waseda University
AS Elfen Sayama FC 2-1 Speranza FC Takatsuki
Albirex Niigata 1-2 JFA Academy Fukushima
Vegalta Sendai 0-2 Urawa Reds
Okayama Yunogo Belle 9-0 Nojima Stella Kanagawa
Kamimura Gakuen High School 0-6 Iga FC Kunoichi
JEF United Chiba 4-0 Fukuoka J. Anclas
Tokiwagi Gakuken High School 0-6 Nippon TV Beleza

Quarterfinals
INAC Kobe Leonessa 4-0 AS Elfen Sayama FC
JEF United Chiba 2-2 (pen 4–2) Nippon TV Beleza
JFA Academy Fukushima 0-3 Urawa Reds
Okayama Yunogo Belle 1-2 Iga FC Kunoichi

Semifinals
Iga FC Kunoichi 1-1 (pen 3–4) JEF United Chiba
INAC Kobe Leonessa 1-0 Urawa Reds

Final
INAC Kobe Leonessa 1-0 JEF United Chiba
INAC Kobe Leonessa won the championship.

References

Empress's Cup
2012 in Japanese women's football